NGRTD (also known as Négritude) is the fourth studio album by French rapper Youssoupha, which was released on May 18, 2015 by Bomayé Music.

Track list
"Où est l'amour ?" (3:11)
"Salaam" (4:37)
"Points communs" (feat. Alonzo, Disiz, Lino, Médine or Sam's) (4:39)
"Maman m'a dit" (3:38)
"Memento" (feat. Les Casseurs Flowters) (3:38)
"Love Musik" (feat. Ayọ) (3:23)
"À cause de moi " (feat. Humphrey) (3:19)
"Chanson française" (3:00)
"Entourage" (5:00)
"Le score" (feat. Nemir) (3:41)
"Niquer ma vie" (4:29)
"Mannschaft" (4:53)
"Black Out" (3:39)
"Smile" (feat. Madame Monsieur) (3:41)
"Négritude" (4:27)
"Mourir mille fois" (5:01)
"Public Enemy" (3:57)

Charts

References

Youssoupha albums
2015 albums
French-language albums